Stelio Belloni (Montevideo, 23 August 1920 - 9 September 1989) was a Uruguayan sculptor.

He was son of the notable Realist sculptor José Belloni.

Selected works 
 Guillermo Cuadri (Santos Garrido). Minas (1956).
 Woman with Pitcher. Piedra Alta Park, Florida.
 Doors of the Cathedral of Florida.
 Avente Haedo, Minas.
 Atilio Narancio, Estadio Centenario, Montevideo.
 José Gervasio Artigas (horseback statue, 12 m tall), Minas, Lavalleja.
 El Entrevero (with José Belloni), Montevideo.

References

External links 
 Website - Taller Belloni

Uruguayan people of Swiss-Italian descent
People from Montevideo
1920 births
1989 deaths
20th-century Uruguayan sculptors
Male sculptors
20th-century Uruguayan male artists